Landsman is a surname. Notable people with the surname include:

 Anne Landsman (born 1959), South African-born female novelist
 Jay Landsman, homicide detective and actor from Baltimore, USA
 Keren Landsman (born 1977), Israeli epidemiologist and science-fiction writer.
 Matilda Landsman, New York Times female employee in the 1950s
 Sandy Landsman, children's book author, born in Great Neck, New York
 Vladimir Landsman (born 1941), Soviet-Canadian violinist and teacher

Fictional characters:
 Jay Landsman (The Wire), character on the HBO drama The Wire, inspired by the real life Jay Landsman
 Meyer Landsman, an alcoholic homicide detective with the Sitka police department in Michael Chabon's 2007 novel The Yiddish Policemen's Union

See also 

 Maik Landsmann (born 1967), East German track cyclist
 Lanzmann, a surname
 Landmann, a surname